Marcos Antônio de Lima (born 14 February 1975), commonly known as Índio, is a retired Brazilian central defender. He played most of his career for Internacional.

Honours

Internacional
Campeonato Gaúcho: 2005, 2008, 2009, 2011, 2012, 2013, 2014
Copa Libertadores: 2006, 2010
FIFA Club World Championship: 2006
Recopa Sudamericana: 2007, 2011
Copa Sudamericana: 2008
Suruga Bank Championship: 2009

Personal honours
Brazilian Bola de Prata (Placar): 2006

External links

±

1975 births
Living people
Brazilian footballers
Grêmio Esportivo Novorizontino players
Clube Atlético Bragantino players
Esporte Clube Santo André players
Figueirense FC players
Botafogo Futebol Clube (SP) players
América Futebol Clube (MG) players
Esporte Clube Juventude players
Sport Club Internacional players
Campeonato Brasileiro Série A players
Association football defenders